Charlie Russell is a music producer, songwriter and mixing engineer based at Dean Street Studios  in London.

Russell has produced albums and tracks for Alt-J, Ho99o9, Wargasm (band), Jamiroquai, Robbie Williams, Kasabian, Chapel Club, Jake Bugg, The Strypes

In 2002 Russell began working at Trevor Horn's at SARM West studios

References

Living people
Year of birth missing (living people)